Khasan Aslanbekovich Akhriyev (born 3 June 1994) is a Russian football player.

Club career
He made his professional debut in the Russian Professional Football League for FC Krasnodar-2 on 12 July 2013 in a game against FC Chernomorets Novorossiysk.

He made his Russian Football National League debut for PFC Spartak Nalchik on 11 July 2016 in a game against FC Kuban Krasnodar.

References

External links

1994 births
Living people
People from Malgobek
Russian footballers
Russia youth international footballers
Association football midfielders
PFC Spartak Nalchik players
FC Angusht Nazran players
FC Krasnodar players
FC Zhemchuzhina Sochi players
FC SKA Rostov-on-Don players
FC Krasnodar-2 players
21st-century Russian people